Ouham is one of the 16 prefectures of the Central African Republic.  Its capital is Bossangoa.

Geography
The prefecture is in the north-west of the Central African Republic. In the north it has a border with Chad. In the south is the prefecture Ombella-Mpoko, in the west the prefecture Ouham-Pendé and in the east the prefectures Nana-Grébizi and Kémo.

References

 
Prefectures of the Central African Republic